Olivier Le Gac (born 27 August 1993 in Brest) is a French cyclist, who currently rides for UCI WorldTeam . He was named in the start list for the 2015 Vuelta a España and the 2016 Giro d'Italia. In June 2017, he was named in the startlist for the 2017 Tour de France.

Major results

2010
 1st  Road race, UCI Junior Road World Championships
 1st Overall GP Général Patton
1st Stage 1
 3rd Overall Le Trophée Centre Morbihan
2011
 2nd  Road race, UEC European Junior Road Championships
 2nd Overall Le Trophée Centre Morbihan
1st Stage 2 (ITT)
 3rd Time trial, National Junior Road Championships
2012
 1st Stage 1 Tour Nivernais Morvan
 3rd La Gainsbarre
 9th Overall Coupe des nations Ville Saguenay
2013
 1st Tour du Pays du Roumois
 2nd Paris–Connerré
 3rd Paris–Tours Espoirs
 6th Road race, UEC European Under-23 Road Championships
2014
 1st Tour de la Creuse
 2nd Tour de Vendée
2017
 8th Classic Loire Atlantique
2018
 6th Tro-Bro Léon
 7th Bretagne Classic
 10th Overall Four Days of Dunkirk
1st Stage 6
2021
 4th Tro-Bro Léon

Grand Tour general classification results timeline

References

External links

1993 births
Living people
French male cyclists
Sportspeople from Brest, France
Cyclists from Brittany